Scolecenchelys cookei is an eel in the family Ophichthidae (worm/snake eels). It was described by Henry Weed Fowler in 1928, originally under the genus Muraenichthys. It is a marine, temperate water-dwelling eel which is known from Hawaii, in the eastern central Pacific Ocean.

References

Fish described in 1928
cookei